Money Island or Ngwe Kyun is an island in the Mergui Archipelago of Taninthayi Region, Myanmar.

Geography 
Money Island lies between Letsok-aw Island to the south and Sabi (Trotter) Island to the north. The passage between Sabi and Money Island is quite shallow. The principal village on the island is Kyauk Lait, on the southeast coast.  The other large village is on the northeast coast. The island is heavily forested and has small bays with sandy beaches on the west side.

References 

Mergui Archipelago
Tanintharyi Region